Trzesieka  (German: Streitzig) is a village in the administrative district of Gmina Szczecinek, within Szczecinek County, West Pomeranian Voivodeship, in north-western Poland. 

References

Trzesieka